The extinct Urequena language (also Urekena or Arequena) is language variety that is closely related to Andoque. It is known only from an unpublished word list by Austrian naturalist Johann Natterer that was probably recorded in June or July 1831.

Vocabulary
The table below adapted from Jolkesky (2016) shows similarities between Urequena and Andoque. The Urequena (Uerequena, Arequena, Orelhudos) data is from an undated 19-century manuscript by Austrian naturalist Johann Natterer. Natterer gives the Içá River (or Putumayo River) as the location of the language.

{| class="wikitable sortable"
! English gloss (translated) !! Portuguese gloss (Jolkesky 2016) !! Urequena (transcription) !! Urequena (IPA) !! Andoque
|-
| 1.S (I) || 1.S || no-, nö- || no-, nə- || no-, o-
|-
| 3.S.INDEF || 3.S.INDEF || ni-, in- || ni-, in- || ni-, i-
|-
| 1.P (we) || 1.P || kau- || kau- || ka(a)-
|-
| water || água || da u koü || daukʷɯ || dʌʉhʉ
|-
| bow || arco || bàarù || baaru || pãhã-se 
|-
| banana || banana || kòka-rè || kɔka-ræ || kɒkɒ-pɤ
|-
| arm || braço || -nùka || -nũka || -nõka
|-
| head || cabeça || -nari || -nari || -tai:
|-
| canoe || canoa || pau kö || paukə || pukə̃
|-
| rain || chuva || da oié || dawiæ || dɤʔi
|-
| finger || dedo || -ni-rui || -ni-rui || -si-domĩ
|-
| tooth || dente || -konì || -konĩ || -kónĩ
|-
| stomach || estômago || -tuu || -tuː || -tura
|-
| star || estrela || vuai kùi || βuaikui || fʉəkhʉ
|-
| tongue || língua || -tschoru || -ʧoru || -sonə̃
|-
| axe || machado || föü || ɸəɯ || pʌʌ
|-
| maize || milho || schuu || ʃuu || soboi
|-
| nose || nariz || -vüta || -βɯta || -pɤta
|-
| eye || olho || -jakoü || -jakoɯ || -ákʌ
|-
| calf, lower leg || pantorrilha || -va || -βa || -pã ‘perna’ ("leg")
|-
| leg || perna || -va-tana || -βa-tana || -pã ‘perna’ ("leg"); -tanə̃ ‘osso’ ("bone")
|-
| net || rede || kooma͠n || koːmã || komə̃
|-
| nail || unha || govü-tarü || ɡoβɯ-tarɯ || -si-kopɤ
|}

See also
Duho languages

References

Andoque–Urequena languages
Indigenous languages of the South American Northwest